This is a summary of the electoral history of Nicola Sturgeon, the First Minister of Scotland since 2014, Leader of the Scottish National Party since 2014, and Member of the Scottish Parliament for various constituencies since 1999.

Council elections

1992 Cunninghame District Council election, Irvine North

1994 Strathclyde Regional Council election,  Baillieston/Mount Vernon

1995 Glasgow City Council election,  Bridgeton

UK Parliamentary elections

1992 UK Parliament election

1997 UK Parliament election

Scottish Parliamentary elections

1999 Scottish Parliament election

Constituency results

Additional member results 
{| class=wikitable
!colspan=8 style=background-color:#f2f2f2|1999 Scottish Parliament election: Glasgow
|-
! colspan="2" style="width: 150px"|Party
! Elected candidates
! style="width: 40px"|Seats
! style="width: 40px"|+/−
! style="width: 50px"|Votes
! style="width: 40px"|%
! style="width: 40px"|+/−%
|-

2003 Scottish Parliament election

Constituency results

Additional member results 
{| class=wikitable
!colspan=8 style=background-color:#f2f2f2|2003 Scottish Parliament election: Glasgow
|-
! colspan="2" style="width: 150px"|Party
! Elected candidates
! style="width: 40px"|Seats
! style="width: 40px"|+/−
! style="width: 50px"|Votes
! style="width: 40px"|%
! style="width: 40px"|+/−%
|-

2007 Scottish Parliament election

2011 Scottish Parliament election

2016 Scottish Parliament election

2021 Scottish Parliament election

Party elections

2004 Scottish National Party depute leadership election

2014 Scottish National Party leadership election

Sturgeon was the only candidate in this election, and was therefore elected unopposed to the position of Leader of the Scottish National Party.

First Minister Nominating Elections

References

Nicola Sturgeon
Sturgeon, Nicola
Sturgeon, Nicola